Kinky is a 2018 American erotic romantic thriller directed, written and produced by Jean-Claude La Marre. The film stars Robert Ri'chard, Dawn Richard, Gary Dourdan, and Vivica A. Fox. The film was released in the United States on October 12, 2018, by Patriot Pictures.

Plot
Dr. Joyce Carmicheal is a shy woman who has strong repressed sexual urges, who also happens to be one of the most renowned African American surgeons in the entire world.  She doesn't have much of a social life, with no husband or boyfriend. At work she is constantly harassed by her coworker who wants to date her, but she tells him she is seeing someone even though she isn't. She meets billionaire investor Tyrone "Greenland" Bernard and becomes attracted to his money. She begins a relationship with him, who introduces her to the kinkier side of sex, such as kissing and holding hands. Joyce becomes more experimental and bold as their erotic relationship develops, including have sex in the bathtub as well as kissing in public. Joyce moves in with Tyrone.

Joyce's friends often meet her after work for salad and to complain about their husbands. Joyce eventually find out that her coworker who has been asking her out is a secret FBI agent, who wants Joyce to wear a recording device to get Tyrone "Greenland" Bernard to confess to his sick crimes. Tyrone has been stealing money from his business and has evaded millions of dollars in tax. As Joyce is in a sexual relationship with Tyrone, she agrees to wearing a wire, which she puts in her hair. That night while she and Tyrone are having sex, right before climaxing he admits that he has been stealing money from his business, which then the FBI breaks into the room and arrest him.

The following day Joyce meets him in death row and she asks him to marry her, which he does. As she leaves, outside she meets her coworker who was the secret FBI agent and it turns out that they were actually husband and wife the entire time, and that Joyce was also an FBI agent secretly tracking Tyrone. After year of eluding them, Joyce came up with the plan to become doctors in order to arrest him. They go to a wedding but before arriving to the marriage, Joyce runs to her therapist and tells her that she is pregnant, but the baby belongs to Tyrone. The therapist congratulates her and she says she will tell her husband that the baby belongs to him.

Cast
 Dawn Richard as Dr. Joyce Carmichael
 Robert Ri'chard as Tyrone Bernard
 Vivica A. Fox as Marshalla
 Gary Dourdan as Greenland
 Marklen Kennedy as Mysterious Man
 Darrin Dewitt Henson as Bradley
 Willie Taylor as Ramone 
 Obba Babatundé as Mr. Bernard 
 Freda Payne as Mrs. Bernard 
 Eurika Pratts as Vanessa 
 Michael Bolwaire as a trainer
 Jean-Claude La Marre as Dr. Richardson

Reception
Austin critic Korey Coleman of Double Toasted slated the film, criticizing the storytelling, characters and ending. He has state numerous times that it is one of his all time worst movies that he has ever seen Movie Nation gave Kinky 2 stars out of five, comparing it to 50 Shades of Grey, but for Black people. They said the movie has "Bad acting by pretty people, awesome sex scenes but not a lot of S&M wear,  What is this, “Fifty Shades of Ebony?”"

References

External links
 
 

2018 films
2018 independent films
2018 romantic drama films
2010s erotic drama films
2010s romantic thriller films
African-American drama films
African-American romance films
American erotic drama films
American erotic romance films
American independent films
American romantic drama films
American romantic thriller films
BDSM in films
2010s English-language films
Films directed by Jean-Claude La Marre
Films set in Atlanta
2010s American films